Stef Kamil Carlens (September 27, 1970, Antwerp, Belgium) is a singer-songwriter, musician, composer, and record producer.

Carlens is best known for his work as the leader of Belgian indie band Zita Swoon (previously known with the names A Beatband and Moondog Jr.). The band gradually changed into the polymorphic collective Zita Swoon Group. Prior to Zita Swoon, he played with dEUS as bassist and singer, before leaving in 1997 to concentrate on his own band.

Carlens is also a visual artist. In his plastic work, he tries to be both his actual age as well as a child.

Collaborations
Collaborations from the 90s to now

External links
Official website Stef Kamil Carlens
Official website Zita Swoon Group

1970 births
Belgian rock musicians
Belgian rock singers
Belgian male guitarists
Belgian painters
Album-cover and concert-poster artists
English-language singers from Belgium
People from Schoten
Living people
21st-century Belgian male singers
21st-century Belgian singers
21st-century guitarists
Deus (band) members